Wallace Parke Benn (born 6 August 1947) is a bishop of the Church of England. He was the area Bishop of Lewes in the Diocese of Chichester from May 1997 until his retirement in October 2012.

Early life and education
Benn was born in Bray, County Wicklow, Ireland on 6 August 1947. He was educated at St. Andrew's College, Dublin, then an all-boys school in Dublin. He studied at University College, Dublin, graduating with a Bachelor of Arts (BA) degree in 1969. In 1969, he entered Trinity College, Bristol, an Evangelical Anglican theological college, to train for ordained ministry. During this time he also studied for a diploma in theology (DipTheol) which was validated by the University of London.

Career

Ordained ministry
Benn was ordained in the Church of England as a deacon in 1972 and as a priest in 1973. His ordained ministry began with curacies at St Mark's New Ferry, Wirral and St Mary's Cheadle, after which he was Vicar of St James the Great, Audley, Staffordshire and finally (before his consecration to the episcopate) St Peter's Harold Wood.

On 1 May 1997, Benn was consecrated a bishop at Southwark Cathedral, by George Carey, Archbishop of Canterbury. He then served as the Bishop of Lewes, an area and suffragan bishop of the Diocese of Chichester. He retired from full-time ministry on 31 October 2012. Since 2013, he has held Permission to Officiate in the Diocese of Peterborough.

Author
Benn has written two books and numerous pamphlets, including The Last Word: Jesus' Teaching in The Upper Room  and Jesus Our Joy: Learning about True Spirituality.

Independent Inquiry into Child Sexual Abuse

The Independent Inquiry into Child Sexual Abuse, undertaken between 2014 and 2022, criticised Benn for his handling of allegations of child sexual abuse during his tenure as Bishop of Lewes. 

Benn's actions had previously been criticised during several inquiries into sexual abuse scandals in the Diocese of Chichester, relating to child abuse by the Rev Roy Cotton and the Rev Colin Pritchard.

Views
Benn has been described as a complementarian evangelical. He is a council member of Reform, a conservative evangelical grouping in the Church of England opposed to women priests and to the consecration of women as bishops. In 2008, he attended the Global Anglican Future Conference (GAFCON) held in Jerusalem.

Personal life
In 1978, Benn married Lindsay Develing. Together they have two children: one son and one daughter.

In 2002, Benn appeared on the popular BBC television motoring series Top Gear, placing third in the first "Fastest Faith" competition.

Styles
 Wallace Benn Esq (to 1973)
 The Revd Wallace Benn (1973–1997)
 The Rt Revd Wallace Benn (1997—present)

References

1947 births
People educated at St Andrew's College, Dublin
Alumni of University College Dublin
20th-century Church of England bishops
21st-century Church of England bishops
Evangelical Anglican bishops
Bishops of Lewes
Living people
Anglican realignment people
Alumni of Trinity College, Bristol